The shadow docket is the use of emergency orders and summary decisions by the Supreme Court of the United States without oral argument. The term was coined in 2015 by University of Chicago Law professor William Baude.

The shadow docket is a break from ordinary procedure. Such cases receive very limited briefings and are typically decided a week or less after an application is filed. The process generally results in short, unsigned rulings. On the other hand, merits cases take months, include oral argument, and result in lengthy opinions detailing the reasoning of the majority and concurring and dissenting justices, if any.

It is used when the Court believes an applicant will suffer "irreparable harm" if its request is not immediately granted. Historically, the shadow docket was rarely used for rulings of serious legal or political significance. However, since 2017, it has been increasingly utilized for consequential rulings, especially for requests by the Department of Justice for emergency stays of lower-court rulings. The practice has been criticized for various reasons, including for bias, lack of transparency, and lack of accountability.

Terminology
The term "shadow docket" was coined in 2015 by William Baude, who wrote:

The term has been used by the justices themselves, with Justice Elena Kagan calling the Court's "shadow-docket decision-making" "every day becom[ing] more unreasoned, inconsistent, and impossible to defend" in a dissent to a denial of an application for injunctive relief in the case Whole Woman's Health v. Jackson (2021). The phrase itself has been criticized by Justice Samuel Alito, who called it "sinister" in a university speech and saying it was "used to portray the court as having been captured by a dangerous cabal that resorts to sneaky and improper methods to get its ways", and by senators, with Ted Cruz, a former solicitor general of Texas, saying: "Shadow docket, that is ominous. Shadows are really bad, like really, really bad".

Procedure 
There are two types of shadow docket orders: ones that deny certiorari and emergency orders for cases still being litigated in lower courts.

In the Supreme Court's ordinary proceedings, cases are filed to the merits docket. Cases are accepted if four justices decide to grant certiorari (the so-called rule of four), with the overwhelming majority being denied (around 80 out of 7,000–8,000 petitions for certiorari are granted each term). Accepted cases then feature full briefings (including from amici curiae, if any) and oral arguments, with cases generally lasting months. Finally, the Court issues a lengthy, signed majority opinion, in which the majority extensively explains its reasoning for the ruling.

For the shadow docket, following an application to the relevant circuit justice, they will decide whether to independently make a ruling or refer it to their colleagues. Applications are dealt with on an accelerated time frame, with decisions coming in a week or less. Should a justice proceed alone, the parties in a case may request that other justices overrule them instead. According to the Court, there are four criteria for stays to be granted:

Shadow docket orders are usually unsigned and unexplained. Court observers may attempt to infer how the justices split based on signed concurrences and dissents, rather than the majority opinion. In the Court's August 2020July 2021 term, the exact vote count was known in 14 cases out of the 73 emergency cases referred to the whole court (there were 150 such cases in total). There were 56 merits docket rulings during that period. Inferences for judicial splits are inexact unless there are three public dissents for certiorari denials or four for all other orders.

History

Historical use 

The shadow docket was used primarily for issuing routine orders, such as giving parties more time to file a brief or extending oral arguments. However, on rare occasions, it was used for consequential rulings such as the 1953 stay of the executions of Julius and Ethel Rosenberg and the emergency injunction ordering a halt to the Nixon administration's bombing of Cambodia.

A major reason why the Court has used the shadow docket has been to manage its caseload. In Maryland v. Baltimore Radio Show, Inc. (1950), Justice Felix Frankfurter explained for a unanimous court why the shadow docket was necessary, stating: "If the Court is to do its work it would not be feasible to give reasons, however brief, for refusing to take these cases. The time that would be required is prohibitive."

Since 2017 
Use of the shadow docket for important rulings has increased precipitously since 2017. This coincided with the presidency of Donald Trump, when the Department of Justice sought emergency relief (generally to stay lower court rulings against its executive actions) from the Supreme Court at a far higher rate than had previous administrations, filing 41 emergency applications over Trump's four years in office (by comparison, over the prior 16 years the Obama administration and the Bush administration together filed only eight emergency applications).

Rulings made by way of the shadow docket during Trump's term included rulings over his travel ban, the diversion of military funds to the construction of a border wall on the U.S.–Mexico border, the prohibition of transgender people from openly serving in the United States military, use of the federal death penalty, and restrictions on asylum seekers from Central America. The Supreme Court granted 28 of the Trump administration's requests; in the 16 years prior, only four were granted.

Following Trump's departure from office, the Court has made rulings against the Biden administration, putting an end to a federal eviction moratorium and nullifying the White House's attempt to end the Remain in Mexico policy. The latter was decided in an order two paragraphs long. In September 2021, the shadow docket gained more prominence after the Court declined to block the Texas Heartbeat Act from being enforced and decided some technical matters concerning how it could be challenged in Whole Woman's Health v. Jackson.

In 2021, both the House Judiciary Committee and its Senate counterpart held its first hearings on the practice in February and September respectively.

Commentary

Unreasonable judicial power
Critics contend that the shadow docket gives the Supreme Court an unreasonable amount of power. Nicholas Stephanopoulos, a law professor at Harvard University, has argued that the "idea of unexplained, unreasoned court orders seems so contrary to what courts are supposed to be all about... If courts don't have to defend their decisions, then they're just acts of will, of power. They're not even pretending to be legal decisions."

David D. Cole, the national legal director of the American Civil Liberties Union and a professor at Georgetown University Law Center, has likewise said that if the Court can "make significant decisions without giving any reasons, then there's really no limit to what they can do". Steve Vladeck, the Charles Alan Wright chair of federal courts at University of Texas School of Law, has lambasted the novel uses of the shadow docket, writing in the New York Times:

Solicitor General of Alabama Edmund LaCour has defended the use of the shadow docket, stating that due to "time-sensitive matters" it would be inappropriate to use the usual channels and its existence was important to keep the Court functioning properly; former U.S. Senate Judiciary chair Chuck Grassley saying that the Court's decision in Whole Woman's Health v. Jackson was "something very ordinary".

Transparency
The shadow docket has been criticized for a lack of transparency. William Baude has argued that the shadow docket makes it "hard for the public to know what is going on" and "hard for the public to trust that the court is doing its best work". Similarly, House Judiciary courts subcommittee chair Hank Johnson has contended: "Knowing why the Justices selected certain cases, how each of them voted, and their reasoning is indispensable to the public's trust in the court's integrity."

The Economist has argued that the shadow docket displays a "deficit of transparency and accountability", while Steve Vladeck has criticized how decisions are "handed down at all hours of the day... with little opportunity for public involvement or scrutiny." He has argued: "For a Court whose legitimacy depends largely on the public's perception of its integrity, the growth of unseen, unsigned, and unexplained decisions that disrupt life for millions of Americans can only be a bad thing".

Criticisms of the lack of transparency of the shadow docket preceded the term's coinage in 2015. In 2014, New York Times Supreme Court correspondent Adam Liptak criticized the Court's opinions as "not abstruse. They are absent." This was in response to Chief Justice John Roberts's comments in his 2005 confirmation hearing that he hoped "we haven't gotten to the point where the Supreme Court's opinions are so abstruse that the educated layperson can't pick them up and read them and understand them".

Bias
Baude has spoken to a bias present in the rates at which requests are granted, saying that the "government, especially the federal government, has a special ability to get the court's attention." Vladeck further criticized this apparent bias:

Rigor
The shadow docket has also been criticized for its lack of rigor. Vladeck has argued that the shadow docket "put[s] the justices in the position of deciding weighty legal issues at a very early stage of litigation, in a context in which it is often unclear exactly what the relevant facts are and in which legal arguments have not been fully developed."

Similarly, Shoba Sivaprasad Wadhia, a professor and associate dean at Penn State Law, has stated that "it's hard to imagine that [the justices] have the same deliberation or time to think about the varying arguments by each party." Ian Millhiser, a journalist at Vox who covers the Supreme Court, has argued that "if the Supreme Court pushes too many of its decisions onto its shadow docket, the justices in the majority may never figure out that their first instinct regarding how to decide a case was flawed."

Alito defended the rigor behind the decisions made in the shadow docket, highlighting how time constraints limited what could be expressed in the Court's opinions and how the writing had to be done carefully: "Journalists may think that we can just dash off an opinion the way they dash off articles".

Increased use
Although over the years the justices have sought to assert that it is "a court of final review and not first view", with the maxim being repeated in 11 of the October 2018 term's cases, other criticism has been directed at the significant uptick in the use of the shadow docket.

In September 2019, Justice Sonia Sotomayor criticized the government's over-reliance on the practice in a dissent to an unexplained immigration order, saying that "the Government has treated this exceptional mechanism as a new normal. Historically, the Government has made this kind of request rarely; now it does so reflexively." She went on further, stating that "Not long ago, the Court resisted the shortcut the Government now invites. I regret that my colleagues have not exercised the same restraint here."

David Cole has similarly argued that "relief should be restricted to the most egregious cases truly requiring expedited action, yet it is increasingly being applied to run-of-the-mill disputes."

Justice Samuel Alito has defended the increased use of the shadow docket, saying it was due to increased applications and comparing it to "complaining about the emergency room for treating too many accident victims who come in".

While the Supreme Court has had a 6-3 conservative majority since the appointment of Justice Amy Coney Barrett in October 2020, the shadow docket had seen increased use, and the Court treats these orders as precedential despite the lack of opinions attached to the order. The remaining liberal justices, Stephen Breyer, Sonia Sotomayor, and Elena Kagan, had spoken in various dissents to shadow docket orders on their questionable use. Chief Justice John Roberts also joined in a dissent on the use of shadow dockets in a case involving the Clean Water Act that had been authored by Kagan.

Precedential effect
As the highest court in the United States, the Supreme Court's rulings have precedential value, being used by the lower courts as guidance for their own rulings. However, by their very nature, shadow docket orders are unexplained and are not intended for use as such. Writing in the Harvard Journal of Law and Public Policy, Judge Trevor N. McFadden of the federal District of Columbia district court argued that not all shadow docket decisions should be used for precedent: he said that lower courts should only focus on stays issued by the full Court and that this instruction is "true even if the stay grant features little legal reasoning, and may well be true even when there is no reasoning."

For example, with respect to denials of certiorari, Justice Frankfurter wrote:

Despite that, the use of shadow docket orders as precedent has increased in recent years.

See also 
 Procedures of the Supreme Court of the United States
 History of the Supreme Court of the United States

References 

Supreme Court of the United States
United States appellate procedure
Transparency (behavior)
2015 neologisms